Philip of Milly, also known as Philip of Nablus (c. 1120 – April 3, 1171), was a baron in the Kingdom of Jerusalem and the seventh Grand Master of the Knights Templar. He briefly employed the troubadour Peire Bremon lo Tort in the Holy Land.

Early life

Philip was the son of Guy of Milly, a knight of French origin, who witnessed a dozen of royal charters in the Kingdom of Jerusalem between 1108 and 1126. Guy held fiefs in the royal demesne around Nablus and Jerusalem. Guy's wife was a Flemish noblewoman, Stephanie, according to the late 13th-century Lignages d'Outremer. The same source stated that Philip was his parents' eldest son, but the sobriquet of his brother, GuyFrancigena (or "born in France")implies that Guy was Philip's elder brother, born before their parents come to the Holy Land. The Lignages d'Outremer also claimed that Philip was a nephew of Pagan the Butler, but no other primary source refers to Pagan as Philip's uncle.

The date of Guy's death is unknown, but he was most probably still alive in the early 1130s. Philip inherited his father's estates around Nablus. He married a noblewoman, Isabella, before 1144. Her name is the only known fact about her, but Steven Runciman writes that she was a niece of Pagan the Butler.

Philip first appeared in a royal charter in 1138. He and his brothers are absent from the lists of witnesses of royal charters in the 1130s. Their absence shows that they could not secure their father's position during the reign of King Fulk, who seized the throne through his marriage with Queen Melisende and appointed his own men to the most important offices.

Royal vassal

Lord of Nablus

Philip's career started only after Fulk died and Melisende became the actual ruler of Jerusalem. He was first mentioned as lord of Nablus in 1144. Late in that year, the queen appointed Philip along with Elinand, Prince of Galilee, and Manasses of Hierges, to lead a relieve army to Edessa, but Imad ad-Din Zengi captured the town before they approached it. During the following years, he seized further fiefs, including lands in the hills near Nablus and Tyre. In 1148, upon the arrival of the Second Crusade, Philip participated in the council held at Acre, where he and the other native barons were overruled and the ill-fated decision to attack on Damascus was made.

Along with the powerful Ibelin family, Philip was a supporter of Melisende during her conflict with her son Baldwin III. In the division of the kingdom in 1151, Melisende gained control of its southern part, including Nablus. Despite this arrangement, Philip assisted Baldwin during the siege of Ascalon in 1153. He granted estates to Order of Saint Lazarus in 1153. From 1155, Philip was regularly listed among the witnesses on Baldwin's charters. He participated in the relief of Banyas in June 1157, but he and his troops soon returned home, and were not present at Nur ad-Din's subsequent ambush of Baldwin at Jacob's Ford.

Lord of Oultrejordain

Philip exchanged the lordship of Nablus with Baldwin III for Oultrejordain on 31 July 1161. For Melisende was dying, the agreement was confirmed by her sister, Hodierna, on her behalf. The king retained the revenues from tolling the caravans and the Bedouin tribes crossing Oultrejordain. One of Philip's new vassals, John Gothman, was required to directly swear fealty to the king. Philip strengthened Kerak Castle with a ditch and towers. He made a pilgrimage to Saint Catherine's Monastery in the early 1160s.

Knight Templar

Philip joined the military order of the Knights Templar in January 1166, passing on to them a significant part of Oultrejordain, including the castle of Ahamant. Acting against the decision of the Templars, Philip joined Amalric's invasion of Egypt in 1167. The Ibelin family later recalled an event during the siege of Bilbeis, in which Philip saved the life of Hugh of Ibelin, who had broken his leg when his horse fell in a ditch. The Templars as a whole refused to support Amalric's invasion, and the king blamed them for the failure of the expedition. After the death of their Grand Master Bertrand de Blanchefort in January 1169, Amalric pressured them to elect Philip in his place in August of that year. With the election of Philip, Amalric regained Templar support for the invasion of Egypt, although by the end of the year Amalric was forced to retreat.

For unknown reasons Philip resigned as Grand Master in 1171, and was succeeded by Odo de St Amand. Philip accompanied Amalric to Constantinople as ambassador to the Byzantine Empire in order to restore good relations with them after the failure of the Egyptian invasion. He probably died on April 3, before reaching Constantinople.

Family

Philip's personal life is largely a mystery. William of Tyre describes him as one of the "brave men, valiant in arms and trained from their earliest years in the art of war" who accompanied Amalric to Egypt., Sometime after he became lord of Oultrejordain, he made a pilgrimage to the monastery of Saint Catherine's Monastery on Mount Sinai. With his wife Isabella he had a son, Rainier (who predeceased him), and two daughters, Helena and Stephanie. Isabella died probably in 1166, which may have led to Philip's decision to take vows as a brother of the Knights Templar. His lands were inherited by his elder daughter, Helena, wife of Walter III Brisebarre, lord of Beirut, and after Walter's death, by Stephanie and her husbands.

References

Sources

 
 
 
 
 Setton, Kenneth M., general ed. (1969) A History of the Crusades. 6 vols. Madison, Wis.: University of Wisconsin Press, 1969–1989
Kenneth M. Setton, general editor (1969) A History of the Crusades. Vol.1: The first hundred years; edited by Marshall W. Baldwin. Madison, Wis.: University of Wisconsin Press

1171 deaths
Christians of the Second Crusade
Year of birth uncertain
Grand Masters of the Knights Templar
Lords of Oultrejordain
12th-century French people
Ambassadors to the Byzantine Empire